is a 1995 video game for the Super Famicom that was released to an exclusively Japanese market.

This video game combines the futuristic elements of F-Zero with the whimsical elements of Super Mario Kart. Players can select from various tracks and confront numerous dead ends and alternate turns. There are six drivers in a race and all the menus are in Japanese. The four main characters of the game are: Ultraman Powered (from the Ultra Series), Kamen Rider ZO (from the Kamen Rider franchise), Battle Knight Gundam F-91 (from the Gundam franchise) and Banpresto original character Fighter Roar.

Reception
On release, Famicom Tsūshin scored the game a 24 out of 40.

References

1995 video games
Banpresto games
Science fiction racing games
Minato Giken games
Japan-exclusive video games
Super Nintendo Entertainment System games
Super Nintendo Entertainment System-only games
Multiplayer and single-player video games
Video games developed in Japan
Kamen Rider video games
Ultra Series video games
Gundam video games
Crossover racing games